The 1944–45 New York Rangers season was the franchise's 19th season. During the regular season, the Rangers posted an 11–29–10 record and finished with 32 points.
The Rangers' last-place finish caused them to miss the NHL playoffs.

Regular season

Final standings

Record vs. opponents

Schedule and results

|- align="center" bgcolor="#FFBBBB"
| 1 || 28 || @ Toronto Maple Leafs || 2–1 || 0–1–0
|-

|- align="center" bgcolor="#FFBBBB"
| 2 || 1 || @ Chicago Black Hawks || 8–3 || 0–2–0
|- align="center" bgcolor="#FFBBBB"
| 3 || 2 || @ Detroit Red Wings || 10–3 || 0–3–0
|- align="center" bgcolor="#FFBBBB"
| 4 || 9 || Toronto Maple Leafs || 6–3 || 0–4–0
|- align="center" bgcolor="#CCFFCC"
| 5 || 11 || Detroit Red Wings || 5–2 || 1–4–0
|- align="center" bgcolor="white"
| 6 || 12 || Boston Bruins || 5–5 || 1–4–1
|- align="center" bgcolor="white"
| 7 || 18 || Detroit Red Wings || 2–2 || 1–4–2
|- align="center" bgcolor="#FFBBBB"
| 8 || 19 || Montreal Canadiens || 6–2 || 1–5–2
|- align="center" bgcolor="white"
| 9 || 23 || @ Chicago Black Hawks || 4–4 || 1–5–3
|- align="center" bgcolor="#FFBBBB"
| 10 || 26 || @ Boston Bruins || 8–4 || 1–6–3
|- align="center" bgcolor="#CCFFCC"
| 11 || 30 || @ Montreal Canadiens || 7–5 || 2–6–3
|-

|- align="center" bgcolor="#FFBBBB"
| 12 || 2 || @ Toronto Maple Leafs || 4–3 || 2–7–3
|- align="center" bgcolor="#FFBBBB"
| 13 || 7 || Detroit Red Wings || 3–2 || 2–8–3
|- align="center" bgcolor="white"
| 14 || 10 || Chicago Black Hawks || 1–1 || 2–8–4
|- align="center" bgcolor="#FFBBBB"
| 15 || 12 || @ Boston Bruins || 7–5 || 2–9–4
|- align="center" bgcolor="#FFBBBB"
| 16 || 17 || Montreal Canadiens || 4–1 || 2–10–4
|- align="center" bgcolor="#CCFFCC"
| 17 || 20 || @ Chicago Black Hawks || 3–1 || 3–10–4
|- align="center" bgcolor="#FFBBBB"
| 18 || 21 || @ Detroit Red Wings || 11–3 || 3–11–4
|- align="center" bgcolor="white"
| 19 || 24 || Chicago Black Hawks || 3–3 || 3–11–5
|- align="center" bgcolor="#FFBBBB"
| 20 || 27 || Toronto Maple Leafs || 8–2 || 3–12–5
|- align="center" bgcolor="#FFBBBB"
| 21 || 30 || @ Montreal Canadiens || 4–1 || 3–13–5
|- align="center" bgcolor="#CCFFCC"
| 22 || 31 || Boston Bruins || 3–2 || 4–13–5
|-

|- align="center" bgcolor="white"
| 23 || 4 || Detroit Red Wings || 4–4 || 4–13–6
|- align="center" bgcolor="white"
| 24 || 7 || Chicago Black Hawks || 0–0 || 4–13–7
|- align="center" bgcolor="#CCFFCC"
| 25 || 9 || @ Toronto Maple Leafs || 5–4 || 5–13–7
|- align="center" bgcolor="#CCFFCC"
| 26 || 11 || Boston Bruins || 5–1 || 6–13–7
|- align="center" bgcolor="#FFBBBB"
| 27 || 14 || Montreal Canadiens || 6–2 || 6–14–7
|- align="center" bgcolor="#FFBBBB"
| 28 || 18 || @ Detroit Red Wings || 7–3 || 6–15–7
|- align="center" bgcolor="#FFBBBB"
| 29 || 20 || @ Montreal Canadiens || 5–2 || 6–16–7
|- align="center" bgcolor="#FFBBBB"
| 30 || 21 || @ Boston Bruins || 14–3 || 6–17–7
|- align="center" bgcolor="#CCFFCC"
| 31 || 24 || @ Chicago Black Hawks || 4–3 || 7–17–7
|- align="center" bgcolor="#FFBBBB"
| 32 || 27 || @ Toronto Maple Leafs || 3–0 || 7–18–7
|- align="center" bgcolor="#FFBBBB"
| 33 || 28 || Toronto Maple Leafs || 7–0 || 7–19–7
|-

|- align="center" bgcolor="white"
| 34 || 4 || @ Boston Bruins || 3–3 || 7–19–8
|- align="center" bgcolor="#FFBBBB"
| 35 || 8 || @ Montreal Canadiens || 9–4 || 7–20–8
|- align="center" bgcolor="#FFBBBB"
| 36 || 11 || Montreal Canadiens || 4–3 || 7–21–8
|- align="center" bgcolor="#FFBBBB"
| 37 || 14 || @ Detroit Red Wings || 4–2 || 7–22–8
|- align="center" bgcolor="#CCFFCC"
| 38 || 15 || Chicago Black Hawks || 6–2 || 8–22–8
|- align="center" bgcolor="#FFBBBB"
| 39 || 17 || @ Boston Bruins || 6–1 || 8–23–8
|- align="center" bgcolor="#CCFFCC"
| 40 || 18 || Boston Bruins || 2–1 || 9–23–8
|- align="center" bgcolor="#CCFFCC"
| 41 || 22 || Detroit Red Wings || 5–3 || 10–23–8
|- align="center" bgcolor="white"
| 42 || 24 || @ Toronto Maple Leafs || 4–4 || 10–23–9
|- align="center" bgcolor="white"
| 43 || 25 || Boston Bruins || 4–4 || 10–23–10
|-

|- align="center" bgcolor="#FFBBBB"
| 44 || 1 || Chicago Black Hawks || 5–3 || 10–24–10
|- align="center" bgcolor="#FFBBBB"
| 45 || 4 || Toronto Maple Leafs || 6–3 || 10–25–10
|- align="center" bgcolor="#FFBBBB"
| 46 || 7 || @ Chicago Black Hawks || 6–3 || 10–26–10
|- align="center" bgcolor="#FFBBBB"
| 47 || 8 || @ Detroit Red Wings || 7–3 || 10–27–10
|- align="center" bgcolor="#FFBBBB"
| 48 || 10 || @ Montreal Canadiens || 7–3 || 10–28–10
|- align="center" bgcolor="#FFBBBB"
| 49 || 11 || Montreal Canadiens || 11–5 || 10–29–10
|- align="center" bgcolor="#CCFFCC"
| 50 || 18 || Toronto Maple Leafs || 6–5 || 11–29–10
|-

Playoffs
The Rangers finished the season in last place in the NHL for the third consecutive season and missed the 1945 Stanley Cup playoffs.

Player statistics
Skaters

Goaltenders

†Denotes player spent time with another team before joining Rangers. Stats reflect time with Rangers only.
‡Traded mid-season. Stats reflect time with Rangers only.

Awards and records

Transactions

See also
1944–45 NHL season

References

External links
 

New York Rangers seasons
New York Rangers
New York Rangers
New York Rangers
New York Rangers
Madison Square Garden
1940s in Manhattan